Kambur is a mountain in Suðuroy, Faroe Islands, located on the northern side of the village Porkeri: Kambur is also visible from Hov.

References

External links 
 Visitsuduroy.fo, The Tourist Information Center
 Porkeri.fo, The municipality of Porkeri.

Mountains of the Faroe Islands
Suðuroy